Daniel N. Durant (born December 24, 1989) is an American stage and screen actor. His breakthrough starring role was as Moritz Stiefel in the 2015 Broadway revival of Spring Awakening. Durant starred in the Academy Award-winning film CODA (2021). He and the cast won the Special Jury Award for Ensemble Cast in the U.S. Dramatic Competition at its world premiere at the 2021 Sundance Film Festival, along with the award for Outstanding Performance by a Cast in a Motion Picture at the 28th Screen Actors Guild Awards. On television, he is known for his recurring role in the ABC Family series Switched at Birth (2013–2017).

Early life
Durant was born deaf in Detroit, Michigan to deaf parents who struggled with addiction; he was adopted as a toddler by his paternal aunt Lori Durant and later her wife Mary Engels. He grew up in Duluth, Minnesota. He attended the Minnesota State Academy for the Deaf in Faribault and graduated in 2008. He studied at the National Technical Institute for the Deaf at the Rochester Institute of Technology (RIT) in Rochester, New York, receiving an associate degree in applied computer technology in 2011. He subsequently attended Gallaudet University, earning a degree in 2014.

He joined the Deaf West Theatre in 2012 for its production of Cyrano de Bergerac.

Career
On September 8, 2022, Durant was announced as a contestant on season 31 of Dancing with the Stars. He was partnered with Britt Stewart.They reached the semifinals and finished in 5th place.

Personal life
On February 14, 2023, Durant confirmed his relationship with his former Dancing with the Stars partner Britt Stewart.

Filmography

Film

Television

Theater

Awards and nominations

References

External links 
 
 
 

1989 births
Living people
American adoptees
American male stage actors
American male television actors
American male deaf actors
Gallaudet University alumni
Male actors from Detroit
Male actors from Duluth, Minnesota
Outstanding Performance by a Cast in a Motion Picture Screen Actors Guild Award winners
Rochester Institute of Technology alumni
Theatre World Award winners